The 1892 Mercer Baptists football team represented Mercer University in the 1892 college football season. They finished with a record of 1–0 as they won their only game 12–6 for their first win in program history.

Schedule

References

Mercer
Mercer Bears football seasons
College football undefeated seasons
Mercer Baptists football